The Music of Smash is the first soundtrack album by the cast of the American musical television series Smash. It was released by Columbia Records on May 1, 2012 and sold 39,000 copies in its first week. As of June 27, 2012, it has sold 112,000 copies.

Background
The album was released in standard and deluxe versions. The standard version featured 13 tracks, consisting of seven covers and six original songs (all written by Marc Shaiman and Scott Wittman, with the exception of "Touch Me", which is written by Ryan Tedder, Brent Kutzle, Bonnie McKee and Noel Zancanella). The version being sold at Target features five bonus tracks for a total of 18.

Track listing

Deluxe edition

Charts

Weekly charts

Year-end charts

References

2012 soundtrack albums
Columbia Records soundtracks
Smash (TV series)
Television soundtracks